Archilema dentata is a moth of the subfamily Arctiinae. It was described by Lars Kühne in 2007. It is found in Kenya.

References

Endemic moths of Kenya
Moths described in 2007
Lithosiini
Moths of Africa